IRL (In Real Life) is a Swedish 2013 drama film, directed by Erik Leijonborg and starring Valter Skarsgård, Happy Jankell and Alba August. The picture is a remake of the Belgian film Ben X (2006) by Nic Balthazar.

Plot 

Elias (Valter Skarsgård) is a high school junior struggling with constant bullying and torment from his fellow students, especially his neighbour, Agnes (Alba August). Increasingly distant from his divorced father, Stefan, younger brother, Jonas, and his best friend, Adam, he finds solace in the online game The Secret World, where he befriends the avatar Sc4rlet.

After yet another incident at his school where he is stripped down and videotaped, and ridiculingly edited footage uploaded to YouTube, Elias becomes increasingly angry and depressed, contemplating suicide. Later that night, Sc4rlet sends him her photo and an invitation to meet at the central station of their hometown, Stockholm, but after his phone is stolen by Agnes and destroyed, their meeting is ruined as Elias cannot find her. Spotting her on the train home, he is afraid of talking to her, and steps off of the train with the intention of jumping on the tracks. He is narrowly saved by Sc4rlet, who suspected the boy of being him, and they soon become friends.

As things progress, Sc4rlet begins pressuring Elias to stand up for himself, helping him plan his revenge on his tormentors. They decide to go after Agnes, the leader of the gang, hoping that it will cause the others to stop. They soon make a plan to strip her naked and post photos of her on the internet, mirroring what she did to Elias earlier, and later steal drugs from the local hospital for him to use. The following day, Elias attacks her during an outdoors gymnastics class, but she managed to fight him off, and he left alone in the forest after she injects him with the drugs intended for her. Hallucinating from the injection, Elias begins seeing Sc4rlet, who leads him to the roof of the building next door to his apartment, where she tells him that they will "die together, like he wants to". Meanwhile, Elias' father, Stefan, finds the stolen drugs in his sons bedroom, alongside an unedited video of the earlier incident at school, given to him by Adam. Stefan then spots Elias alone on the next door roof, and comes to his rescue just in time.

Elias wakes up in the hospital, where Stefan angrily berates him for not telling him about the bullying and the drugs. Stefan asks Elias what he can do to help, and Elias asks him that there's only one thing he wants to do. After being discharged from the hospital, Elias records a suicide letter on video and says goodbye to his friends and family. That night, Sc4rlet appears in his room, and we realize that she never stepped off the train in the beginning, and that Elias has been envisioning her to help him. She spends the night, comforting him. The next day, he boards the ferry to Åland, where Sc4rlet appears once again, asking if he is sure about what he is doing. He sets up his camera to record, and jumps off the ferry in the middle of the sea.

Three days later, Stefan is watching a news report about his sons disappearance and suspected suicide. The next day a memorial is held at his school, where the students mourn Elias. As the principal takes the stage to give a speech, Adam cuts into the projector feed, playing Elias' suicide note to the entire school, who watch in shock as he exposes Agnes and her friends, before cutting to the unedited video of incident, revealing Agnes and her friends as they truly are. As the students struggle to grasp with what they have seen, Elias appears on the gallery behind them, alive and well. A quick flashback reveals that Elias had jumped to a deck below, where his father caught him. They then faked the disappearance and suicide, with the faked suicide video as "evidence", in order to bring attention to the bullying.

Some time later, Stefan, Elias and Jonas, a family once again, is watching an interview with Stefan on television, where he is questioned about the ethics of Elias faking his death like he did. Stefan then responds that bullying is never taken seriously, "not until someone dies. We needed someone to die, so that the world could see the truth." A vision of Sc4rlet appears once again, smiling to Elias, who, for the first time, can smile again. He decides to find her; and using the number she texted him from earlier in the film, tracks her down, learning that her real name is Scarlet Friedmann. The film then ends with Elias finally meeting Scarlet, who recognizes him from the train and tells him that she waited for him at the station and was sad when he never showed up, but is glad that he finally had the courage to meet her.

Cast 
Valter Skarsgård as Elias, a troubled high school junior.
Happy Jankell as Scarlet, Elias' online and later real life friend.
Alba August as Agnes, Elias' neighbour and long-time tormentor
Magnus Krepper as Stefan, Elias' divorced father.
Ola Andreasson as Adam, Elias' best friend.

Production 
The film was shot on location at multiple sites in Stockholm, including Stockholm södra underground train station, during spring and summer 2013. It was released in Sweden on October 25, 2013.

References 

2013 thriller drama films
2013 films
2013 independent films
Swedish thriller drama films
2010s Swedish-language films
Films about autism
Films about bullying
Films about suicide
Films based on Belgian novels
Films set in Sweden
Swedish independent films
2013 drama films
2010s Swedish films